John Daniel Davies (12 January 1874 – 9 April 1948) was a Welsh editor and author. He was from the Ponciau area of Denbighshire. He began his career as an apprentice of David Jones, printer, of Rhosymedre. He then worked for a while with Richard Mills who printed the Rhos Herald. Sometime around 1900 he married, and moved to live in the Blaenau Ffestiniog area, where in 1906 he started the periodical Y Rhedegydd. For many years he edited Yr Ymwelydd, the Scottish Baptist periodical. He died in April 1948, and was buried in Bethesda cemetery, Blaenau Ffestiniog.

References 

1874 births
1948 deaths
People from Denbighshire
Welsh writers
Welsh newspaper editors